Spottiswoode may refer to:

People
Spottiswoode (surname)

Commerce
 Eyre & Spottiswoode Ltd., London-based printing firm

Places
 a former (until 1903) name of Spotswood, Victoria, a suburb of Melbourne, Australia
 Spottiswoode Park Estate, a housing area and former plantation in Singapore

See also
Spotswood (disambiguation)